Pseudoschrankia is a genus of moths of the family Noctuidae.

Species
Pseudoschrankia cyanias (Meyrick, 1899)
Pseudoschrankia epichalca (Meyrick, 1899)
Pseudoschrankia leptoxantha (Meyrick, 1904)
Pseudoschrankia brevipalpis Medeiros, 2015

References

Natural History Museum Lepidoptera genus database
Medeiros, Matthew J. (2015). Two new endemic Hawai‘ian Lepidoptera: a new species of Pseudoschrankia (Erebidae) from O‘ahu, and a new species of Thyrocopa (Xyloryctidae) from Moloka‘i. Zootaxa. 3990: 593–597.  doi: https://dx.doi.org/10.11646/zootaxa.3990.4.8

Hypeninae